Hastina caeruleolineata is a moth in the family Geometridae first described by Frederic Moore in 1888. It is found in Myanmar, China and India.

References

Moths described in 1888
Asthenini